Google Cloud Dataflow is a fully managed service for executing Apache Beam pipelines within the Google Cloud Platform ecosystem.

History 
Google Cloud Dataflow was announced in June, 2014 and released to the general public as an open beta in April, 2015. In January, 2016 Google donated the underlying SDK, the implementation of a local runner, and a set of IOs (data connectors) to access Google Cloud Platform data services to the Apache Software Foundation. The donated code formed the original basis for Apache Beam.

References

External links 
 

Dataflow
Cloud computing